Seahill railway station is located in the townland of Ballyrobert in the Seahill area of Holywood, County Down, Northern Ireland. The station was opened on 4 April 1966.

Service

Extra services operate at peak times, and the service reduces to hourly operation in the evenings, certain peak-time express trains will pass through Seahill station without stopping.

On Sundays there is an hourly service in each direction.

References

Railway stations in County Down
Railway stations opened in 1966
Railway stations served by NI Railways
Railway stations in Northern Ireland opened in the 20th century